The GR 9 is a long-distance walking route of the Grande Randonnée network in France. The route connects Saint-Amour, Jura with Port Grimaud.

Along the way, the route passes through:
 Saint-Amour, Jura
 Lajoux
 Culoz
 Grenoble
 Saillans, Drôme
 Monieux
 Trets
 Rocbaron
 Port Grimaud

References

Links
 GR9 From Jura to Mediterranean (Full itinerary)

Hiking trails in France